Mastech Digital, Inc., simply referred to as Mastech Digital, is a digital transformation and information technology (IT) services company headquartered in Pittsburgh, Pennsylvania, providing services to corporations across North America, Middle East, Asian, and Japan.

History 

Mastech Digital, Inc. was founded in Pittsburgh, PA in 1986, and was originally known as Mastech Holdings, Inc. The company became listed on Nasdaq in 1996.

In 2000, the company’s name was changed to iGate Capital Corporation, and was split into nine separate business units. Mastech Holdings, Inc., which became one of the units, was spun off as a separately-listed company in 2008, with revenue close to USD $100 million.

In May 2015, Mastech Holdings, Inc. announced its plan to acquire the US IT staffing business of Hudson Global Inc. The deal was finalized in June of the same year, and valued at USD $17 million.

Mastech Holdings, Inc. changed its name to Mastech Digital, Inc. in September 2016. The company stated its name change was “part of its re-branding initiative to reinforce the message that it is fully committed to the world of “digital” – which includes social, mobility, analytics, and cloud; automation; and Internet of Things technologies."

On July 7, 2017 Mastech Digital entered into an agreement to acquire InfoTrellis, Inc., a Canada-based information management consulting and technology services company that provides project and consulting services in master data management, data integration, and big data. The deal was finalized on July 13 and valued at USD $55 million. The acquired entity was renamed as Mastech InfoTrellis, as a business unit under Mastech Digital.

On June 2, 2020, Mastech Digital launched its Remote Staffing service offering, called MAS-REMOTE. Through this service, Mastech Digital helps its customers hire top 10% US based IT remote consultants, backed by a comprehensive screening and on-boarding process.

On October 1, 2020, Mastech Digital entered into an agreement to acquire AmberLeaf Partners, Inc., a Chicago-based customer experience consulting company. The acquired entity is affiliated with Mastech InfoTrellis valued at USD $14 million. The combined businesses will provide customers with an expanded suite of service offerings, delivery capabilities, and human capital across North America, EMEA, India and ASEAN countries.

Locations 
Mastech Digital has offices in Pittsburgh, PA, Atlanta, GA, Boston, MA, Tampa, FL, Lake Mary, FL, Dallas, TX, Austin, TX, Fremont, CA, Chicago, IL, Toronto, Canada, Noida, India, and Chennai, India.

Recognition 
On November 30, 2020, Mastech Digital was recognized by TechServe's Excellence in the New Normal Honors.

On December 8, 2020, Vivek Gupta, President & CEO of Mastech Digital, was recognized in 2020 Pittsburgh Smart 50. Vivek Gupta was recognized for the third consecutive year in a row for smart leadership and business transformation.

References 

Companies listed on the Nasdaq
Companies listed on the New York Stock Exchange
Companies based in Pittsburgh